Sungai Pinang is a neighbourhood in the city of George Town in Penang, Malaysia.

Sungai Pinang may also refer to:

 Sungai Pinang (Kelantan state constituency), a Malaysian state constituency
 Sungai Pinang (Penang state constituency), Malaysia
 Bandar Baru Klang (state constituency), formerly known as Sungai Pinang, Selangor, Malaysia